A community bank is a depository institution that is typically locally owned and operated.

Community Bank may refer to:

 Community Bank, N.A., a bank headquartered in DeWitt, New York, U.S.
 New York Community Bank, a bank headquartered in Westbury, New York, U.S.
 Community Bank (Oregon), a bank headquartered in Joseph, Oregon, U.S.
 Community Bank Bangladesh Limited, a bank headquartered in Dhaka, Bangladesh

See also
 Community banking models